Richard Earl Hensley (September 8, 1927 – March 7, 2015) was an American football end who played three seasons in the National Football League (NFL) with the New York Giants, Pittsburgh Steelers and Chicago Bears. He was drafted by the Giants in the eleventh round of the 1949 NFL Draft. He played college football at the University of Kentucky and attended Williamson High School in Williamson, West Virginia. He died on March 7, 2015.

References

External links
Just Sports Stats

1927 births
2015 deaths
American football ends
Chicago Bears players
Kentucky Wildcats football players
New York Giants players
People from Williamson, West Virginia
Pittsburgh Steelers players
Players of American football from West Virginia